The following list shows the GDP (nominal) of Mexico's 32 federal states as of 2021, ranked in order.

Top 30 metro areas of Mexico with most GDP:

See also
 List of Mexican states by GDP per capita
 List of Mexican states by Human Development Index

General:
 List of states of Mexico
 Ranked list of Mexican states

References

GDP
GDP
Mexican states
Mexico, GDP